Asiata is a surname. Notable people with the surname include:

Isaac Asiata (born 1992), American football player
Johan Asiata (born 1985), American football player
John Asiata (born 1993), Australian rugby league player
Matt Asiata (born 1987), American football player
Patrick Asiata (born 1985), Samoan footballer
Richie Asiata (born 1996), Australian rugby player
Luana Asiata New Zealand abstract artist